The EirGrid U20 Footballer of the year, (previously known as the Cadbury's Hero of the Future) is a Gaelic football award given to the top performing under-20 (formerly under-21) player in the Provincial and All-Ireland Championship each year. The award was first awarded in 2006.

List of winners

References

External links
 Official website

Gaelic football awards